The following outline is provided as an overview of and topical guide to Guatemala:

Guatemala – sovereign country located in Central America bordering Mexico to the northwest, the Pacific Ocean to the southwest, Belize and the Caribbean Sea to the northeast, and Honduras and El Salvador to the southeast.

A representative democracy, its capital is Guatemala City. The nation has been stable since the conclusion of the Civil War in  1996 and has been in a state of continuous development and economic growth. Guatemala's abundance of biologically significant and unique ecosystems contribute to Mesoamerica's designation as a biodiversity hotspot.

General reference

 Pronunciation: 
 Common English country name: Guatemala
 Official English country name: The Republic of Guatemala
 Common endonym(s):  
 Official endonym(s):  
 Adjectival(s): Guatemalan, Chapin
 Demonym(s):
 Etymology: Name of Guatemala
 International rankings of Guatemala
 ISO country codes: GT, GTM, 320
 ISO region codes: See ISO 3166-2:GT
 Internet country code top-level domain: .gt

Geography of Guatemala 

Geography of Guatemala
 Guatemala is: a country
 Location:
 Northern Hemisphere and Western Hemisphere
 Americas
 North America
 Middle America
 Central America
 Time zone:  Central Standard Time (UTC-06)
 Extreme points of Guatemala
 High:  Volcán Tajumulco 
 Low:  North Pacific Ocean and Caribbean Sea 0 m
 Land boundaries:  1,687 km
 962 km
 266 km
 256 km
 203 km
 Coastline:  400 km
 Population of Guatemala: 14,027,000; Demographics of Guatemala

 Area of Guatemala: 108,890 km2
 Atlas of Guatemala

Environment of Guatemala 

 Climate of Guatemala
 Holdridge life zones in Guatemala
 Geology of Guatemala
 List of earthquakes in Guatemala
 Protected areas of Guatemala
 Biosphere reserves in Guatemala
 National parks of Guatemala
 Wildlife of Guatemala
 Fauna of Guatemala
 Birds of Guatemala
 Mammals of Guatemala
 Flora of Guatemala
 Trees of Guatemala

Natural geographic features of Guatemala 

 Islands of Guatemala
 Lakes of Guatemala
 Mountains of Guatemala
 Volcanoes in Guatemala
 Rivers of Guatemala
 World Heritage Sites in Guatemala

Regions of Guatemala

Administrative divisions of Guatemala 

 Departments of Guatemala
 Municipalities of Guatemala

Departments of Guatemala 

Departments of Guatemala

Municipalities of Guatemala 

Municipalities of Guatemala
 Capital of Guatemala: Guatemala City
 Cities of Guatemala

Demography of Guatemala 

Demographics of Guatemala

Government and politics of Guatemala 

Politics of Guatemala
 Form of government: unitary presidential representative democratic republic
 Capital of Guatemala: Guatemala City
 Elections in Guatemala
 1974, 1978, 1982, 1986, 1990, 1994, 1995, 1999, 2003, 2007
 Political parties in Guatemala

Branches of the government of Guatemala 

Government of Guatemala

Executive branch of the government of Guatemala 
 Head of state: President of Guatemala, Álvaro Colom (2008–2012)
 Head of government: President of Guatemala
 Cabinet of Guatemala
 Ministries of Guatemala
 Secretariats of the Presidency of Guatemala

Legislative branch of the government of Guatemala 

 Congress of the Republic (unicameral)

Judicial branch of the government of Guatemala 

Court system of Guatemala
 Supreme Court of Guatemala

Foreign relations of Guatemala 

Foreign relations of Guatemala
 Diplomatic missions in Guatemala
 Diplomatic missions of Guatemala

International organization membership 
The Republic of Guatemala is a member of:

Agency for the Prohibition of Nuclear Weapons in Latin America and the Caribbean (OPANAL)
Central American Bank for Economic Integration (BCIE)
Central American Common Market (CACM)
Central American Integration System (SICA)
Food and Agriculture Organization (FAO)
Group of 24 (G24)
Group of 77 (G77)
Inter-American Development Bank (IADB)
International Atomic Energy Agency (IAEA)
International Bank for Reconstruction and Development (IBRD)
International Chamber of Commerce (ICC)
International Civil Aviation Organization (ICAO)
International Criminal Police Organization (Interpol)
International Development Association (IDA)
International Federation of Red Cross and Red Crescent Societies (IFRCS)
International Finance Corporation (IFC)
International Fund for Agricultural Development (IFAD)
International Hydrographic Organization (IHO)
International Labour Organization (ILO)
International Maritime Organization (IMO)
International Monetary Fund (IMF)
International Olympic Committee (IOC)
International Organization for Migration (IOM)
International Organization for Standardization (ISO) (correspondent)
International Red Cross and Red Crescent Movement (ICRM)
International Telecommunication Union (ITU)
International Telecommunications Satellite Organization (ITSO)
International Trade Union Confederation (ITUC)

Inter-Parliamentary Union (IPU)
Latin American Economic System (LAES)
Latin American Integration Association (LAIA) (observer)
Multilateral Investment Guarantee Agency (MIGA)
Nonaligned Movement (NAM)
Organisation for the Prohibition of Chemical Weapons (OPCW)
Organization of American States (OAS)
Permanent Court of Arbitration (PCA)
Rio Group (RG)
Unión Latina
United Nations (UN)
United Nations Conference on Trade and Development (UNCTAD)
United Nations Educational, Scientific, and Cultural Organization (UNESCO)
United Nations Industrial Development Organization (UNIDO)
United Nations Interim Force in Lebanon (UNIFIL)
United Nations Mission in the Sudan (UNMIS)
United Nations Operation in Cote d'Ivoire (UNOCI)
United Nations Organization Mission in the Democratic Republic of the Congo (MONUC)
United Nations Stabilization Mission in Haiti (MINUSTAH)
Universal Postal Union (UPU)
World Confederation of Labour (WCL)
World Customs Organization (WCO)
World Federation of Trade Unions (WFTU)
World Health Organization (WHO)
World Intellectual Property Organization (WIPO)
World Meteorological Organization (WMO)
World Tourism Organization (UNWTO)
World Trade Organization (WTO)

Law and order in Guatemala 

Law of Guatemala
 Capital punishment in Guatemala
 Constitution of Guatemala
 Crime in Guatemala
 Human rights in Guatemala
 LGBT rights in Guatemala
 Freedom of religion in Guatemala
 Law enforcement in Guatemala

Military of Guatemala 

Military of Guatemala
 Command
 Commander-in-chief: President of Guatemala Álvaro Colom Caballeros
 Ministry of Defence of Guatemala
 Military Chief of Staff

 Forces
 Army of Guatemala
 Navy of Guatemala
 Air Force of Guatemala
 Special forces of Guatemala
Kaibiles

History of Guatemala 

History of Guatemala

Culture of Guatemala 

Culture of Guatemala
 Cuisine of Guatemala
 Languages of Guatemala
 National symbols of Guatemala
 Coat of arms of Guatemala
 Flag of Guatemala
 National anthem of Guatemala
 People of Guatemala
 Prostitution in Guatemala
 Religion in Guatemala
 Buddhism in Guatemala
 Islam in Guatemala
 World Heritage Sites in Guatemala

Art in Guatemala 
 Literature of Guatemala
 Music of Guatemala

Sports in Guatemala 

 Football in Guatemala
 Guatemala at the Olympics

Economy and infrastructure of Guatemala 

Economy of Guatemala
 Economic rank, by nominal GDP (2007): 78th (seventy-eighth)
 Banking in Guatemala
 Bank of Guatemala (central bank)
 Communications in Guatemala
 Internet in Guatemala
 Companies of Guatemala
Currency of Guatemala: Quetzal
ISO 4217: GTQ
 Guatemala Stock Exchange
 Transport in Guatemala
 Transportation in Guatemala
 Airports in Guatemala
 Rail transport in Guatemala
 Tourism in Guatemala
 Water supply and sanitation in Guatemala

Education in Guatemala 

Education in Guatemala

See also

Index of Guatemala-related articles
List of international rankings
Member state of the United Nations
Outline of geography
Outline of North America

References

External links

 
 Rights Action - Website of Rights Action, with special reports on mining, human rights, the struggles of indigenous people, and impunity
 Network in Solidarity with the People of Guatemala = Website of Network in Solidarity with the People of Guatemala, with special reports on justice and accountability
 Guatemala Human Rights Commission/USA - Website of the Guatemala Human Rights Commission/USA, with special reports on human rights, genocide trials, impunity, the Mérida Initiative, femicide, Bishop Gerardi's assassination, and more.

Guatemala